Brian Johansen (born 18 June 1972) is a Danish boxer. He competed in the men's middleweight event at the 1996 Summer Olympics.

References

1972 births
Living people
Danish male boxers
Olympic boxers of Denmark
Boxers at the 1996 Summer Olympics
Sportspeople from Aalborg
Middleweight boxers